This article lists political parties in Austria. Austria has a multi-party system. Of the over 1,100 registered political parties, only few are known to the larger public. Since the 1980s, four parties have consistently received enough votes to get seats in the national parliament.

The parties

Parties represented in Parliament or the European Parliament
There are five parties represented in the National Council. Three of the parties in the National Council are also represented in the Federal Council. Four of the five parties in the National Council are represented in the European Parliament.

Parties represented in state parliaments

 Citizens' Forum Austria (FRITZ)
 Communist Party of Austria (KPÖ)
 MFG – Austria People – Freedom – Fundamental Rights (MFG)
 Team Carinthia (TK)

Minor parties
 Team HC Strache – Alliance for Austria (HC)
 Alliance for the Future of Austria (BZÖ)
 Black-Yellow Alliance (SGA)
 The Beer Party (BIER)
 Christian Party of Austria (CPÖ)
 The Change
  (EL)
 My Vote Counts! (G!LT) 
 Neutral Free Austria Federation (NFÖ)
 Party of Labour of Austria (PdA)
 Pirate Party of Austria (PPÖ)
 Socialist Left Party (SLP)
 The Social Liberals (SoL)
 Volt Austria

Major historical parties
 Christian Social Party (CS, 1893–1933)
 Country League (1918–1934)
 Greater German People's Party (GDVP, 1918–1934)
 JETZT - Pilz List (JETZT, 2017–2020)
 National Socialist German Workers Party (NSDAP, 1919–1945)
 Fatherland Front (VF, 1933–1938)
 Federation of Independents (VdU, 1949–1955)
 Social Democratic Workers Party of Austria (SDAPÖ, 1888–1934), predecessor of today's SPÖ
 Team Stronach (2012–2017)

Minor historical parties
 Communist Initiative (2004–2013)
 Communist League of Austria (KBÖ, 1976–1980)
 Czechoslovak Social Democratic Workers Party in the Republic of Austria (1919–1934)
 Freedom Party in Carinthia (FPK, 2009–2013)
 German-National Party (1891–1920)
 Jewish National Party (1892–1930)
 League of Democratic Socialists (BDS, 1959) 
 Liberal Forum (LiF, 1993–2014)
 Marxist–Leninist Party of Austria (MLPÖ, 1967–2006)
 The Democrats (1991–2002)
 The Independents (DU, 1998–1999)
 Union of Revolutionary Workers of Austria (Marxist-Leninist) (VRAÖ, 1968–2005)

See also
 History of Austria
 Liberalism in Austria
 List of political parties by country
 Politics of Austria

Further reading

References

Austria
 List of political parties in Austria
Politics of Austria
Political parties
Political parties
Austria